Trần Quý Cáp (chữ Hán: 陳季恰, 1870–1908), born Trần Nghị, courtesy name Dã Hàng, Thích Phu, pen name Thai Xuyên, was a Vietnamese notable poet and anti-colonialist. He was one among several leading scholars in the  including Phan Chu Trinh, and Huỳnh Thúc Kháng.

In the anti tax-collection case in Trung Kỳ in 1908, he was arrested by the French colonialists and sentenced to death by waist cutting even though the authorities had no evidence.

References

1870 births
1908 deaths
People from Quảng Nam province
Vietnamese male poets
Vietnamese Confucianists
Vietnamese nationalists
Vietnamese democracy activists
Vietnamese independence activists